David Brodsky is an American chess grandmaster.

Chess career
Brodsky began playing chess at the age of 6. He received training from Farrukh Amonatov.

In April 2017, he earned his final International Master norm.

In November 2019, he tied with GM Andrew Tang for first place at the National Chess Congress in Philadelphia. Brodsky achieved the victory by defeating IM Jason Liang in the final round.

In August 2019, he earned his final Grandmaster norm at the 2019 U.S. Masters, though his rating at the time was insufficient to immediately earn the title.

In June 2022, he tied for first place with Alexander Shabalov, Elshan Moradiabadi, and Daniel Naroditsky at the 2022 Carolinas Classic. In July 2022, he defeated Awonder Liang and eventual winner Christopher Yoo in the 7th round of the U.S. Junior Chess Championship, but ultimately finished 5th out of 10 players with a score of 4.5/9. In September 2022, his rating officially surpassed 2500, earning him the Grandmaster title.

Personal life
Brodsky attended high school in Westchester County, New York. After graduation, he began studying computer science and mathematics at the University of Texas at Dallas, where he was also a member of the chess team. The team competed at the President's Cup tournament at Texas Tech University in April 2022, finishing 4th overall.

References

Living people
2002 births
American chess players
Chess grandmasters